Matthias Volz (4 May 1910 in Schwabach – 26 August 2004 in Spalt) was a German gymnast who competed in the 1936 Summer Olympics.

References

1910 births
2004 deaths
German male artistic gymnasts
Olympic gymnasts of Germany
Gymnasts at the 1936 Summer Olympics
Olympic gold medalists for Germany
Olympic bronze medalists for Germany
Olympic medalists in gymnastics
Medalists at the 1936 Summer Olympics
People from Schwabach
Sportspeople from Middle Franconia
20th-century German people
21st-century German people